The 1961 British Empire Trophy was the 23rd British Empire Trophy and an Intercontinental Formula motor race held on 8 July 1961 at the Silverstone Circuit, Northamptonshire. The race was run over 52 laps of the Silverstone Grand Prix circuit, and was won by British driver Stirling Moss in a Cooper T53-Climax, who also set fastest lap. John Surtees in a similar Cooper and Graham Hill in a BRM P48 were second and third, Surtees having started from pole position.

Results

References

British Empire Trophy
British Empire Trophy
British Empire Trophy
British Empire Trophy